Christine Sefolosha (born 1955) is a Swiss painter, born in Montreux.

Work and exhibitions
Her works have been shown at numerous one person and group exhibitions, including at the Cavin Morris Gallery in New York City, American Visionary Art Museum in Baltimore and the Galerie Polad-Hardouin in Paris. and the Halle Saint-Pierre
 
She regularly shows her work at the Judy Saslow Gallery in Chicago. In 2009 she was introduced to Bruxelles's J. Bastien Art Gallery. She founded the studio Quai 1-L'Atelier in 2000 within Montreux' train-station waiting room.

Personal life

Sefolosha is the mother of Thabo Sefolosha, former NBA player who played for the Houston Rockets, Utah Jazz, Atlanta Hawks, Oklahoma City Thunder, and Chicago Bulls.

Sefolosha lived in South Africa for nine years.

References

External links
 Cavin Morris Gallery
 Arbre de lune (short bio and picture, French-language source)
 http://www.rawvision.com/articles/66/sefolosha/sefolosha.html

1955 births
Living people
20th-century Swiss painters
21st-century Swiss painters
Swiss women painters
20th-century Swiss women artists
21st-century Swiss women artists
Swiss contemporary artists
People from Montreux